Les Compagnons de la chanson were a French harmony vocal group, formed in 1946 from an earlier group founded in Lyon, France in 1941. Their best known song was "Les trois cloches" recorded with Edith Piaf in 1946. They were eight or nine members in the group, and they were popular in France with some success internationally, and they continued to perform until 1985.

Career
Les Compagnons de la chanson were originally part of a larger choir formed in 1941 in Lyon under the direction of Louis Liébar as part of the Compagnons de France youth movement of Vichy France, and later acquired the name Compagnons de la musique. The group first met Edith Piaf in 1944 in a benefit concert for railway workers in Paris and Piaf decided to help promote the group. They became Les Compagnons de la chanson in 1946, and Piaf launch the group in Paris in May 1946 at a concert in Club des Cinq.  Jean Cocteau, who was in attendance at their show, wrote of their performance: "The miracle has happened that these two solitudes joined together to create a sound artefact which so expresses France that the tears start to flow."

In July 1946, Les Compagnons and Piaf recorded a French language song, "Les trois cloches", which was written by Jean Villard with an arrangement by group member Marc Herrand. Other songs they recorded with Piaf included "Céline", "Dans les prisons de Nantes", and "C'est pour ça", but it was "Les trois cloches" that would be their most successful song.

Les Compagnons performed with Piaf for two years, including a successful tour in the United States, where they introduced the song "Les trois cloches" to the American audience.  The English version "The Three Bells" with lyrics added by Bert Reisfeld in 1948. Les Compagnons recorded "The Three Bells" without Piaf, and their version of the song reached No. 14 in the United States in 1952, later peaking at No. 21 in the UK Singles Chart in October 1959. The song later became a No. 1 hit for the Browns in 1959, with over one million copies in the US. Brown's version also reached No. 6 in the UK chart.

The line-up of Les Compagnons changed over time; they had eight, then nine members for large part of their career: three tenors, three baritones and three basses, with Fred Mella their principal tenor soloist. In the beginning they usually performed a cappella or with a guitar or another instrument, later performances also included orchestral accompaniment.

They appeared in the 1948 film with Piaf, Neuf Garçons, un cœur. They also performed in the operatta Minnie Moustache in 1956 written by group member Jean Broussolle and Georges van Parys.

After the group and Piaf went on their separate ways, they continued to enjoy successes in France and Belgium until the late 1960s when one of the early members Guy Bourguignon died. Some of Les Compagnons de la chanson's biggest hits were "Le marchand de bonheur", "La marche des anges", "Gondolier", "Tom Dooley", "Verte campagne" ("Greenfields") and the aforementioned and re-titled "The Three Bells". Many songs were original composition, but a large numbers were covers. They had association with Charles Aznavour, and cover some of his songs and had successes with songs cowritten with him, such as "Un Mexicain" and "Roméo".

The group also toured internationally, including North America multiple times, Africa, Russia, Israel, Japan and other countries.
 
Les Compagnons de la chanson made over 350 records and undertook up to 300 concerts per year. They decided to disband in 1980, but their farewell tour lasted for a few years more. Their final concert was February 14, 1985, at the Olympia in Paris. Fred Mella continued to perform as a solo artist until 2008,

Members
The members of the group have varied from the beginning. At the end of 1946, the members of the group were Fred Mella (tenor, 1924–2019), Marc Holtz/Herrand (tenor and conductor, 1925-), Paul Buissonneau (tenor, 1926-2014), Jean Albert (tenor, 1920–2003), Gérard Sabbat (baritone, 1926-2013), Hubert Lancelot (baritone, 1923-1995), Jean-Louis Jaubert (bass, 1920-2013), Guy Bourguignon (bass, 1920-1969), and Jo Frachon (bass, 1919-1992). Fred Mella was the tenor soloist of the group. 

The line-up of the group continued to change over the years.  Buissonneau left after a tour of Quebec in 1949 when he married a Canadian and chose to stay in Canada. He was replaced by Mella's younger brother René  (1926–2019).  Marc Herrand left in 1952 to resume his career as a conductor and was replaced by Jean Broussolle (baritone and composer, 1920-1984). Jean Albert left in 1956 to pursue a solo career, and was replaced by Jean-Pierre Calvet (tenor and lyricist, 1925-1989). Guy Bourguignon died in 1969 but they decided not to replace him. Jean Broussolle left in 1972 to concentrate on his career as a composer, and was replaced by Michel Cassez (Gaston) (1931-). Other members included Mario Hirlé (1925–1992).

Discography

Singles 

Charts source:

References

Pathé-Marconi artists
Capitol Records artists
Columbia Records artists